The 2022 Pekao Szczecin Open was a professional tennis tournament played on clay courts. It was the 29th edition of the tournament which was part of the 2022 ATP Challenger Tour. It took place in Szczecin, Poland between 12 and 18 September 2022.

Singles main-draw entrants

Seeds

1 Rankings are as of 29 August 2022.

Other entrants
The following players received wildcards into the singles main draw:
  Jerzy Janowicz
  Maks Kaśnikowski
  Daniel Michalski

The following players received entry from the qualifying draw:
  Mattia Bellucci
  Jan Choinski
  Georgii Kravchenko
  Martin Krumich
  Rudolf Molleker
  Luca Van Assche

The following player received entry as a lucky loser:
  Louis Wessels

Champions

Singles

 Corentin Moutet def.  Dennis Novak 6–2, 6–7(5–7), 6–4.

Doubles

  Dustin Brown /  Andrea Vavassori def.  Roman Jebavý /  Adam Pavlásek 6–4, 5–7, [10–8].

References

2022
2022 ATP Challenger Tour
2022 in Polish tennis
September 2022 sports events in Poland